In universal algebra, a basis is a structure inside of some (universal) algebras, which are called free algebras. It generates all algebra elements from its own elements by the algebra operations in an independent manner. It also represents the endomorphisms of an algebra by certain indexings of algebra elements, which can correspond to the usual matrices when the free algebra is a vector space.

Definitions 

A basis (or reference frame) of a (universal) algebra is a function  that takes some algebra elements as values  and satisfies either one of the following two equivalent conditions. Here, the set of all  is called the basis set, whereas several authors call it the "basis". The set  of its arguments  is called the dimension set.

Outer condition 

(When an algebra operation has a single algebra element as argument, the value of such a composed function is the one that the operation takes from the value of a single previously computed -ary function as in composition. When it does not, such compositions require that many (or none for a nullary operation) -ary functions are evaluated before the algebra operation: one for each possible algebra element in that argument. In case  and the numbers of  elements in the arguments, or “arity”, of the operations are finite, this is the finitary multiple composition .) 

Inner condition 
This other condition will define bases by the set E of the endomorphisms of the algebra, which are the  homomorphisms from the algebra into itself, through its analytic representation  by a basis. The latter is a function that takes every endomorphism e as argument to get a function m as value: , where this m is the "sample" of the values of e at b, namely  for all i in the dimension set.

Then, according to the inner condition b is a basis, when  is a bijection from E onto the set of all m, namely for each m there is one and only one endomorphism e such that . This is the same as to require that there exists an extension function, namely a function  that takes   every (sample) m as argument to extend it onto an endomorphism    such that .

The link between these two conditions is given by the identity  , which holds for all m and all algebra elements a. Several other conditions that characterize bases for universal algebras are omitted.

As the next example will show, present bases are a generalization of the bases of vector spaces. Then, the name "reference frame" can well replace "basis". Yet, contrary to the vector space case, a universal algebra might lack bases and, when it has them, their dimension sets might have different finite positive cardinalities.

Examples

Vector space algebras 
In the universal algebra corresponding to a vector space with finite dimension the bases essentially are the ordered bases of this vector space. Yet, this will come after several details.

On the contrary, linear independence is a mere instance of present independence, which becomes equivalent to it in such vector spaces. (Also, several other generalizations of linear independence for universal algebras do not imply present independence.)

The functions m for the inner condition correspond to the square arrays of field elements (namely, usual vector-space square  matrices) that serve to build the endomorphisms of vector spaces (namely, linear maps into themselves). Then, the inner condition requires a bijection property from endomorphisms also to arrays. In fact, each column of such an array represents a vector  as its n-tuple of coordinates with respect to the basis b. For instance, when the vectors are n-tuples of numbers from the underlying field and b is the Kronecker basis, m is such an array seen by columns,  is the sample of such a linear map at the reference vectors and  extends this sample to this map as below.

 

When the vector space is not finite-dimensional, further distinctions are needed. In fact, though the functions  formally have an infinity of vectors in every argument, the linear combinations they evaluate never require infinitely many addenda  and each  determines a finite subset J of  that contains all required i.

Still it is allowed, in case it serves some purpose. 

When the space is zero-dimensional, its ordered basis is empty. Then, being the empty function, it is a present basis. Yet, since this space only contains the null vector and its only endomorphism is the identity, any function b from any set  (even a nonempty one) to this singleton space works as a present basis. This is not so strange from the point of view of universal algebra, where singleton algebras, which are called "trivial", enjoy a lot of other seemingly strange properties.

Word monoid 
Let  be an "alphabet", namely a (usually finite) set of objects called "letters". Accordingly, the juxtaposition  will denote the concatenation of two words v and w, namely the word that begins with v and is followed by w.

Then, the inner condition will immediately prove that one of its bases is the function b that makes a single-letter word  of each letter , .

In fact, in the theory of D0L systems (Rozemberg & Salomaa 1980) such  are the tables of  "productions", which such systems use to define the simultaneous substitutions of every  by a single word  in any word u in W: if , then . Then, b satisfies the inner condition, since the function  is the well-known bijection that identifies every word endomorphism with any such table. (The repeated applications of such an endomorphism starting from a given "seed" word are able to model many growth processes, where words and concatenation serve to build fairly heterogeneous structures as in L-system, not just "sequences".)

Notes

References 

 Gould, V. Independence algebras,  Algebra Universalis 33 (1995), 294–318.
 Grätzer, G. (1968). Universal Algebra, D. Van Nostrand Company Inc.. 	
 Grätzer, G. (1979). Universal Algebra 2-nd 2ed., Springer Verlag. .
 Ricci, G. (2007). Dilatations kill fields, Int. J. Math. Game Theory Algebra, 16 5/6, pp. 13–34.
 Rozenberg G. and Salomaa A. (1980). The mathematical theory of L systems, Academic Press, New York. 

Universal algebra